= CTRLZAK studio =

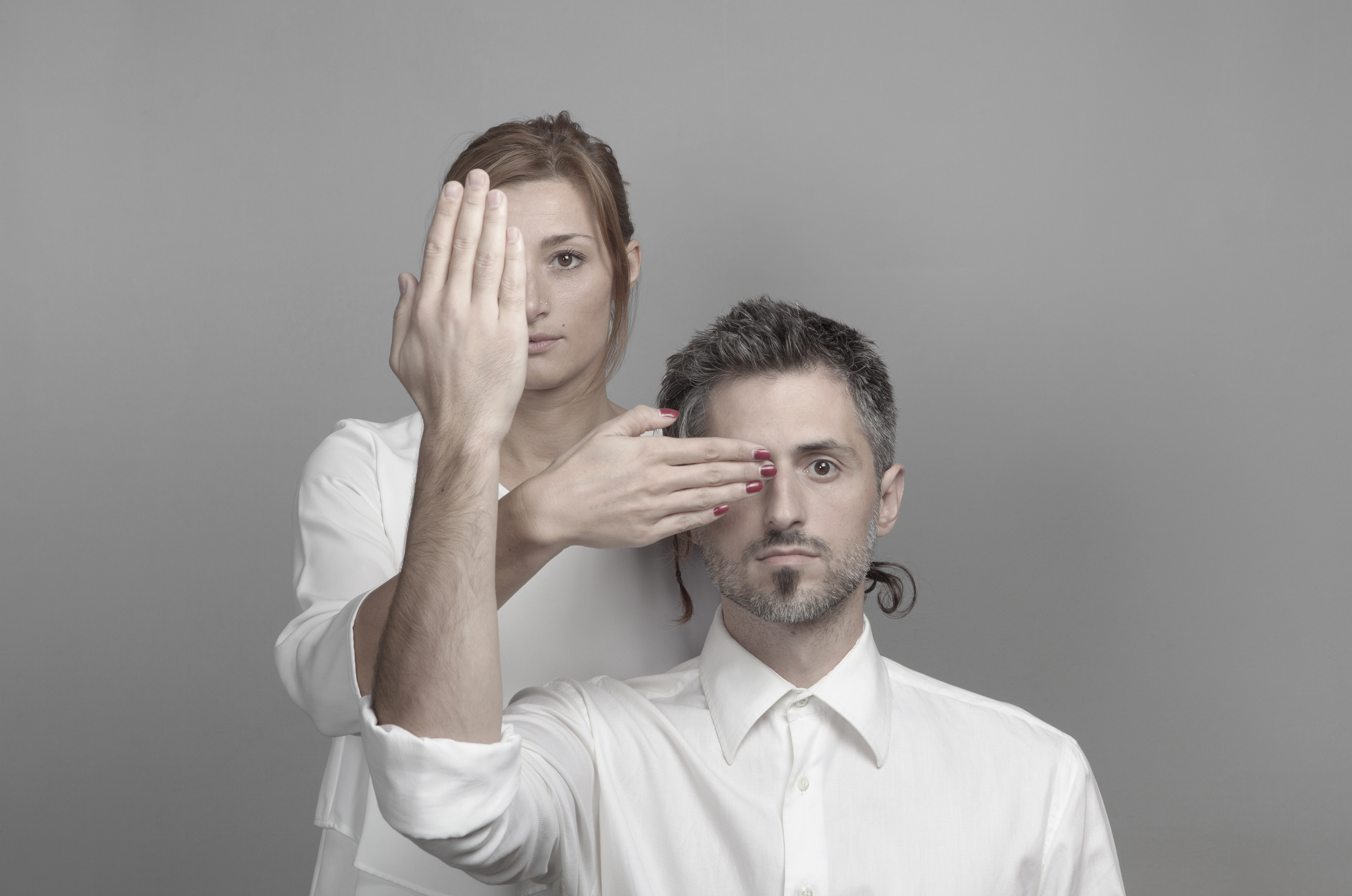
CTRLZAK studio founders Katia Meneghini Thanos Zakopoulos

CTRLZAK (/kənˈtroʊl zæk/) is a hybrid studio bordering between art, design and architecture integrating diverse disciplines and forms of expressions. The studio’s creations are based on extensive research into humanity’s cultural history and the natural world in order to encourage contemplation, reflection and consideration of one’s actions in relation to their impact on the world around them.

The studio’s projects and extensive research into tradition and cultural context aims to create a new hybrid future by learning continuously from the past. Each project is approached as a story waiting to be told, with a multitude of forms and endings, aligning with CTRLZAK’s philosophy of “form follows meaning”.

The name derives from the initials of its founders and the computer key combination CTRL+Z, used in standard alphanumeric keyboards to take you a step back. This is precisely CTRLZAK's approach: to take steps forward by always looking back, to interrogate the past in order to project into the future through the present, with awareness.

== History ==
CTRLZAK was founded in the beginning of 2009 in Milan, Italy, by Katia Meneghini and Thanos Zakopoulos. Both Katia and Thanos brought with them their collective global experience as artists and designers to establish the creative, multidisciplinary studio that would bring to life works in creative areas such as product, furniture, exhibition and interior design as well as art direction and artworks. Their creations are inspired by their travels, experiences, and especially the rich background of their cultures, Italian and Greek, respectively.

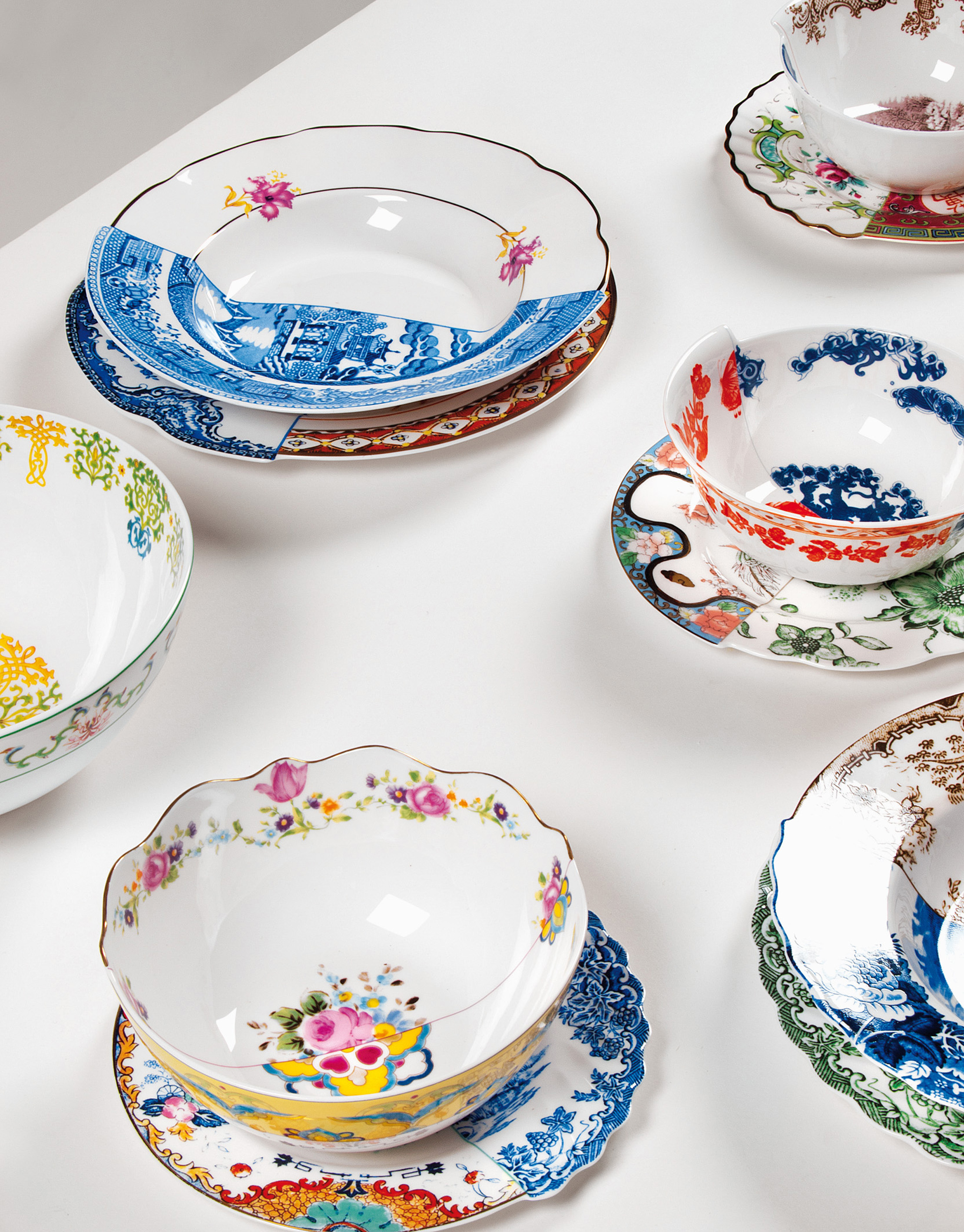
Hybrid collection by CTRLZAK for Seletti

== Selected projects ==
Following on their historical research, CTRLZAK created the CeramiX Art Collection in 2010, consisting of 24 unique pieces derived from classic Chinese and European plates, bowls, vases and cups. The resulting artworks reflect on the historical production of Chinese and European porcelain and centuries of cross-fertilization between Western and Eastern aesthetics. The project was later on translated for a broader audience, bringing art into everyday life, with the Hybrid project (2011– 2015) produced by Italian brand Seletti. The objects are graphically divided between east and west, with a colored line marking the boundary between the two styles. The collection looks at the present while reflecting on the irony of history proposing consequently an evocative contemporary interpretation.

In December 2014, in the exhibition Paradigms of a Hybrid World at Spaziootto in Milan, the studio presented an overview of its research on historical hybridization between east and west including the aforementioned projects together with pieces from their Flagmented project and Cross(me)knot collection designed for rug producer cc-tapis.

Since 2015, they are responsible for the art direction of JCP Universe; an unconventional company between art and design that operates in the sphere of contemporary living. Under the studio's direction the project brought together a number of notable product designers collaborating alongside video makers, theatre professionals, visual artists, writers and other creatives.

CTRLZAK has also dedicated many years (2012–2017) in the research of a project named Extincto, concerning human awareness related to issues of species extinction and the loss of biodiversity caused by mankind, mainly in the last 500 years. Following a meticulous research, they analyzed a number of emblematic cases of extinct species and presented them in the forms of artworks and objects showing how species have in many cases vanished as a result of human intervention and ignorance.

In 2018, Form Follows Meaning: paradigms from CTRLZAK studio, a book detailing the studio’s extensive works from 2009-2017 was published.

Current projects in progress include the design direction of hotel resorts, among them the awarded ekies all senses resort in Chalkidiki, Greece, creative direction for design related brands, art exhibitions and the design of objects connected to the sphere of living for various Italian brands.

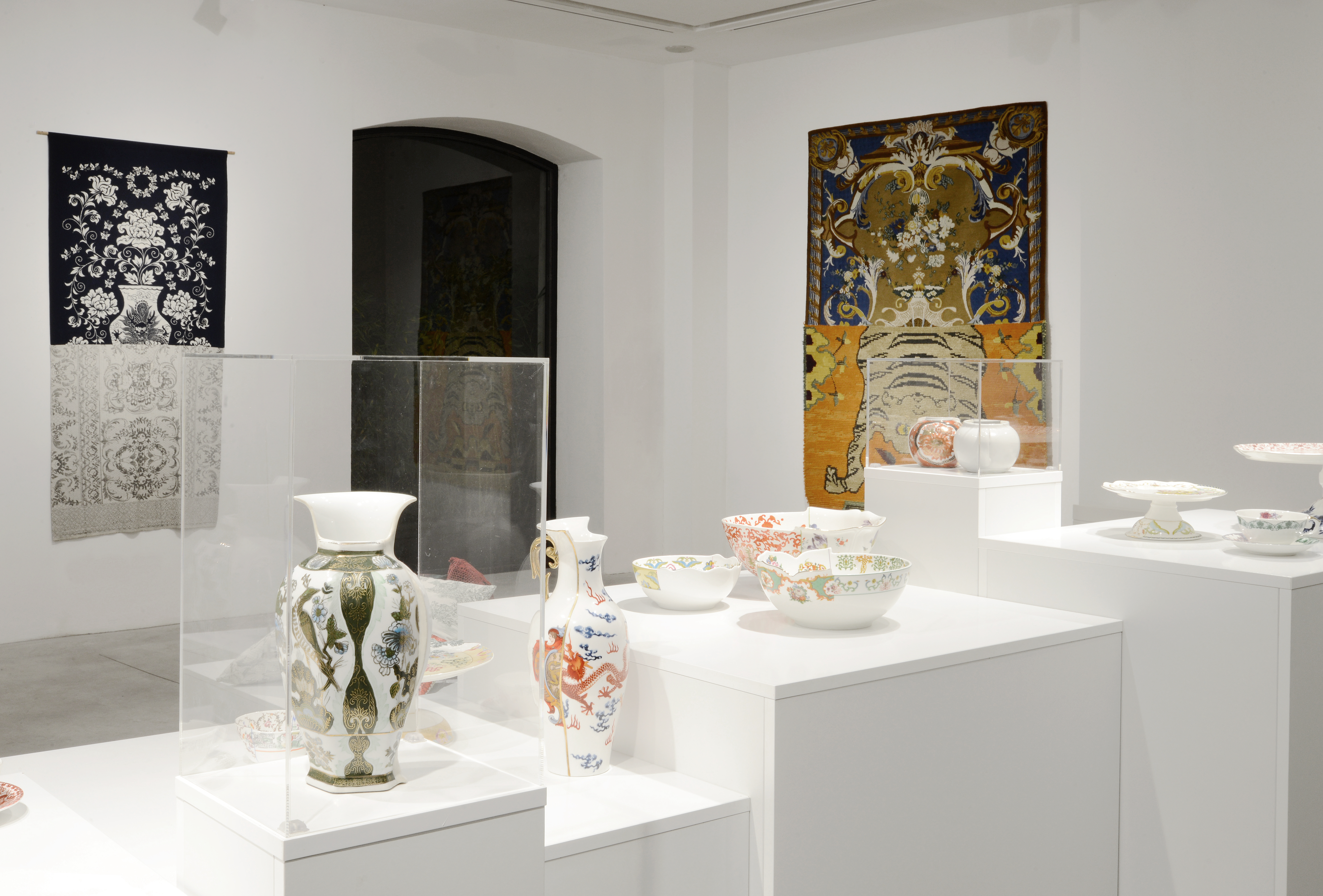
Paradigms of a Hybrid World exhibition, Spaziootto gallery in Milan, Italy, 2014

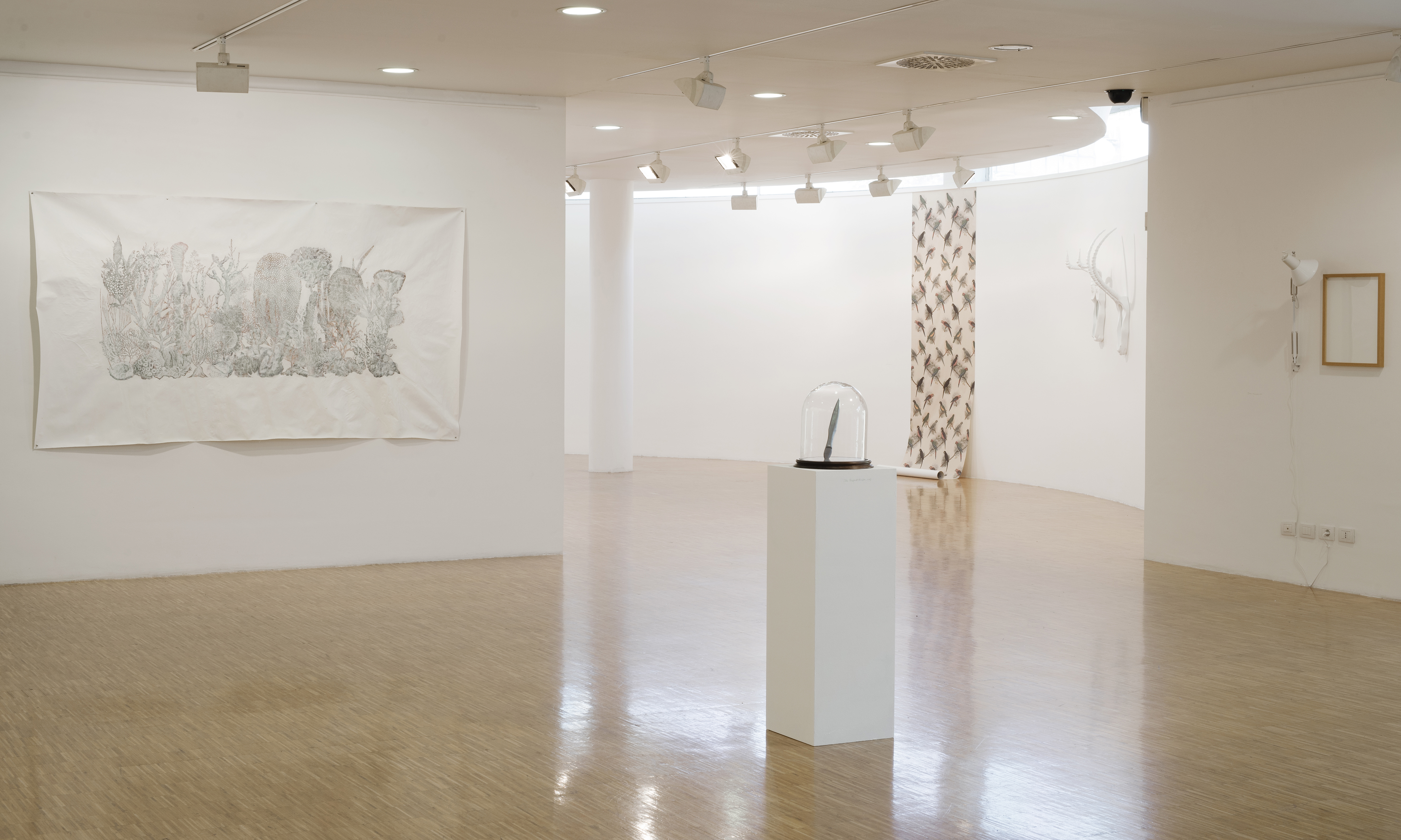
Extincto exhibition, MAC Lissone, Italy, 2017

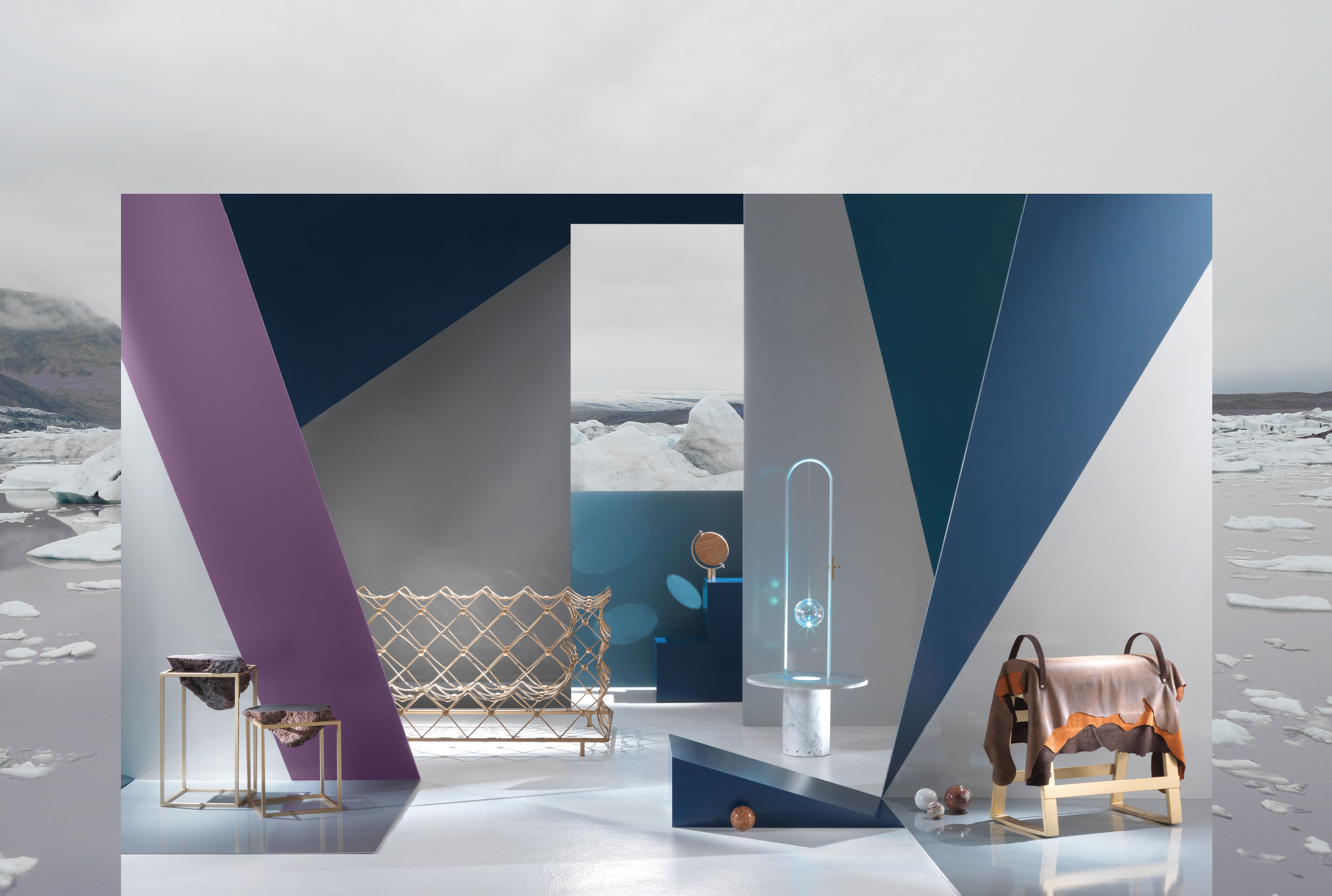
CTRLZAK for JCP Universe: Agaxa Stool, Antivol Side Tables, Naia Table Mirror

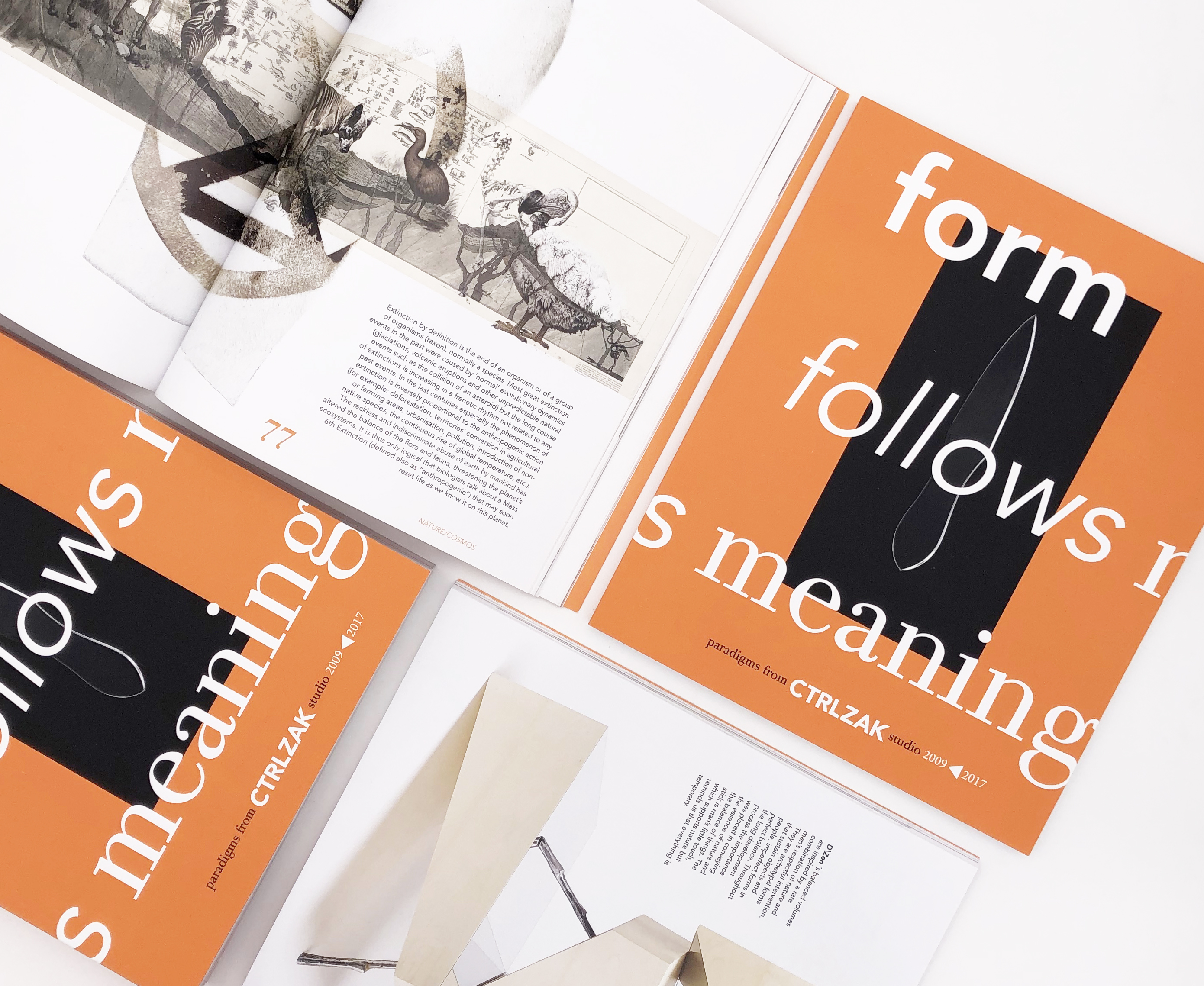
Form Follows Meaning, published 2018

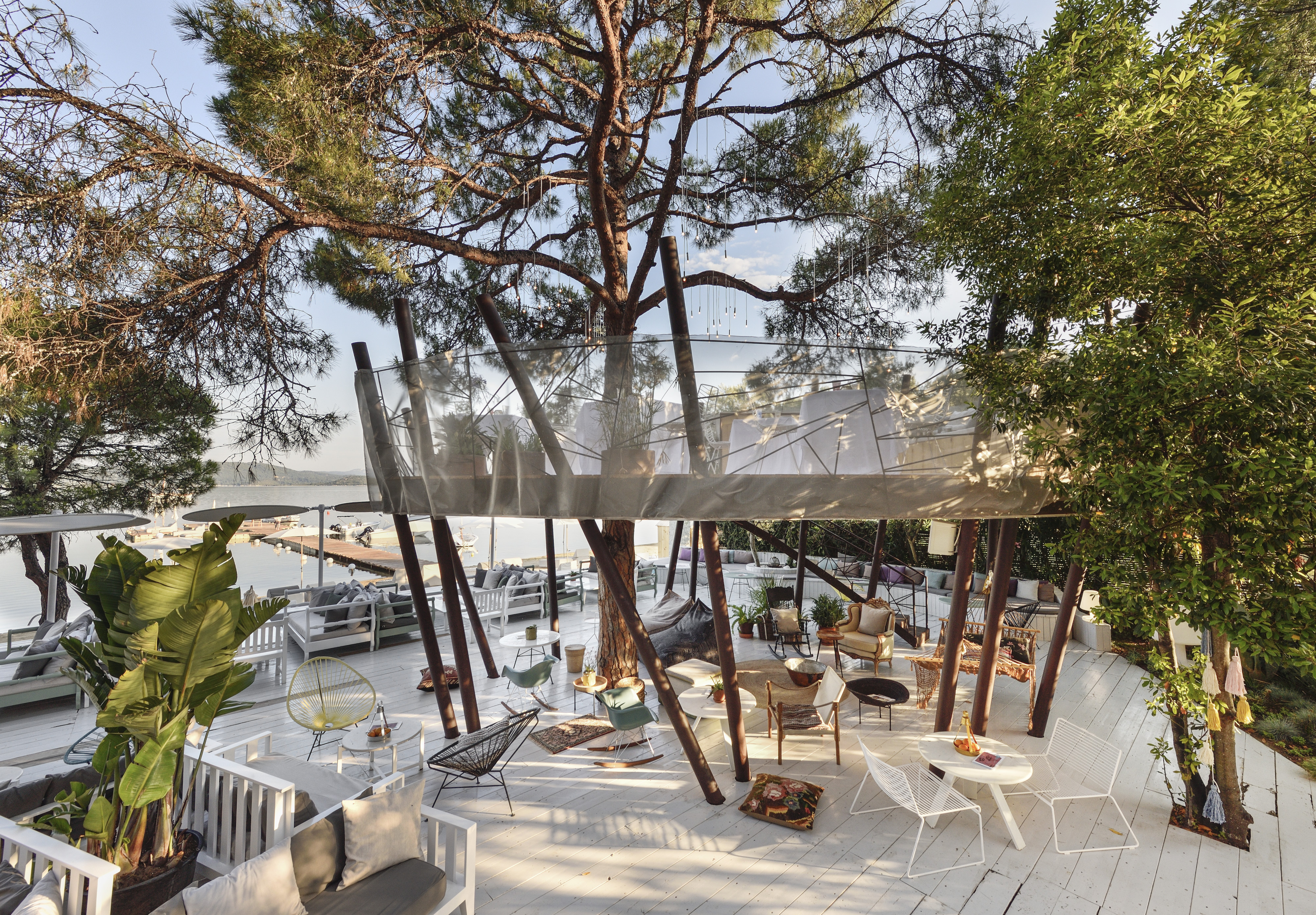
Treehouse Restaurant, Ekies Resort in Greece

== Gallery ==
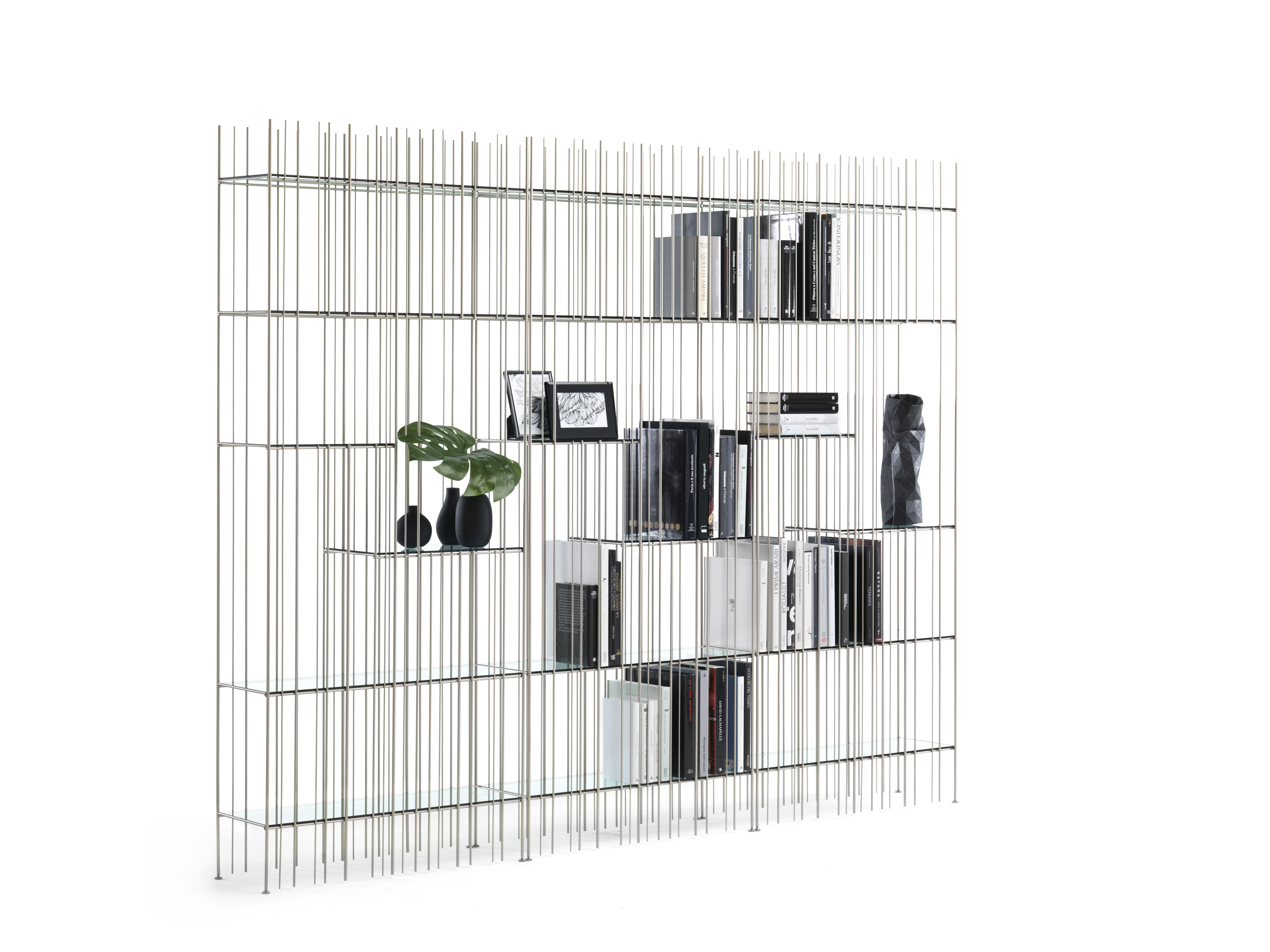
CTRLZAK for Mogg: Metrica Bookcase

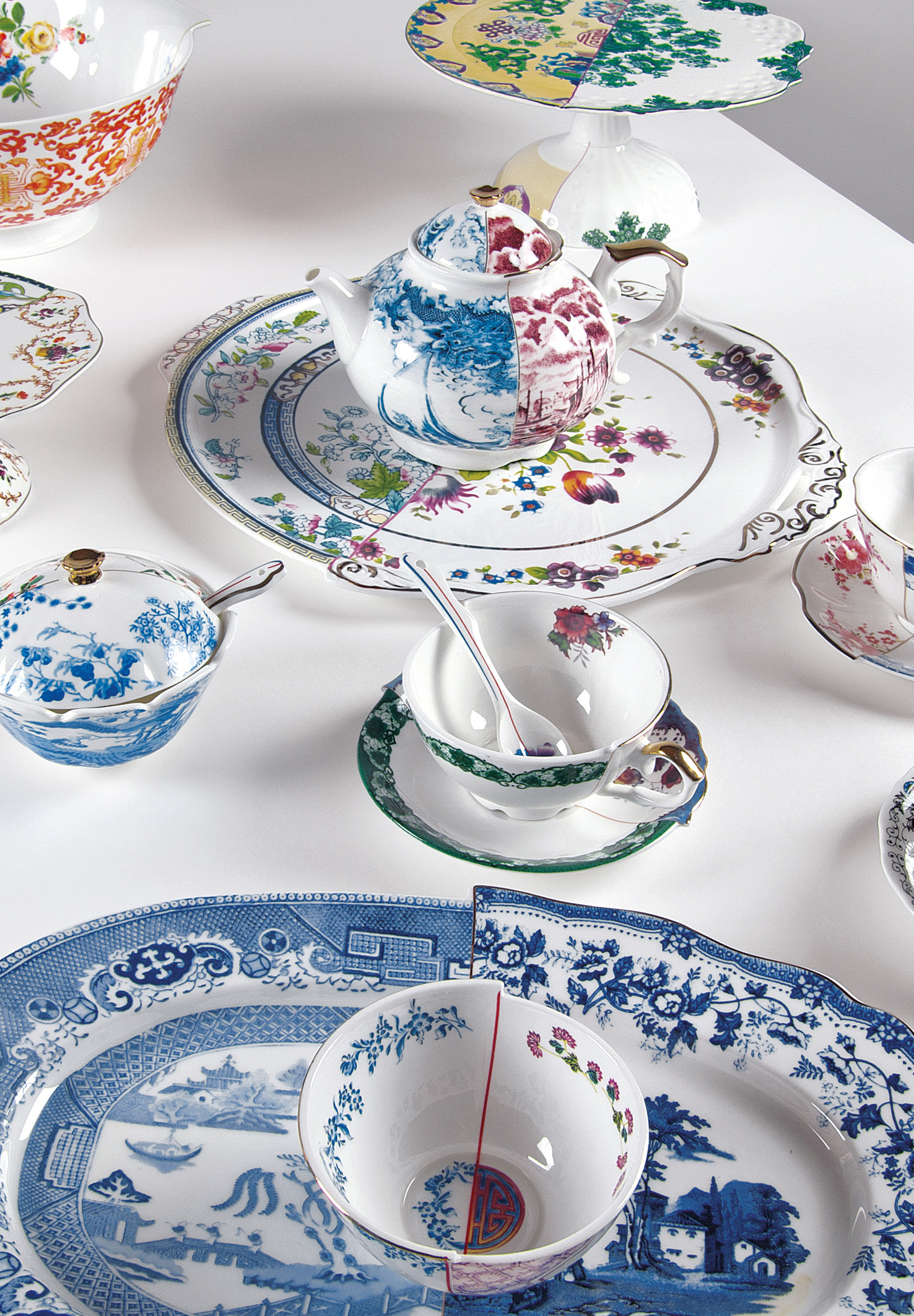
CTRLZAK for Seletti: Hybrid Tableware

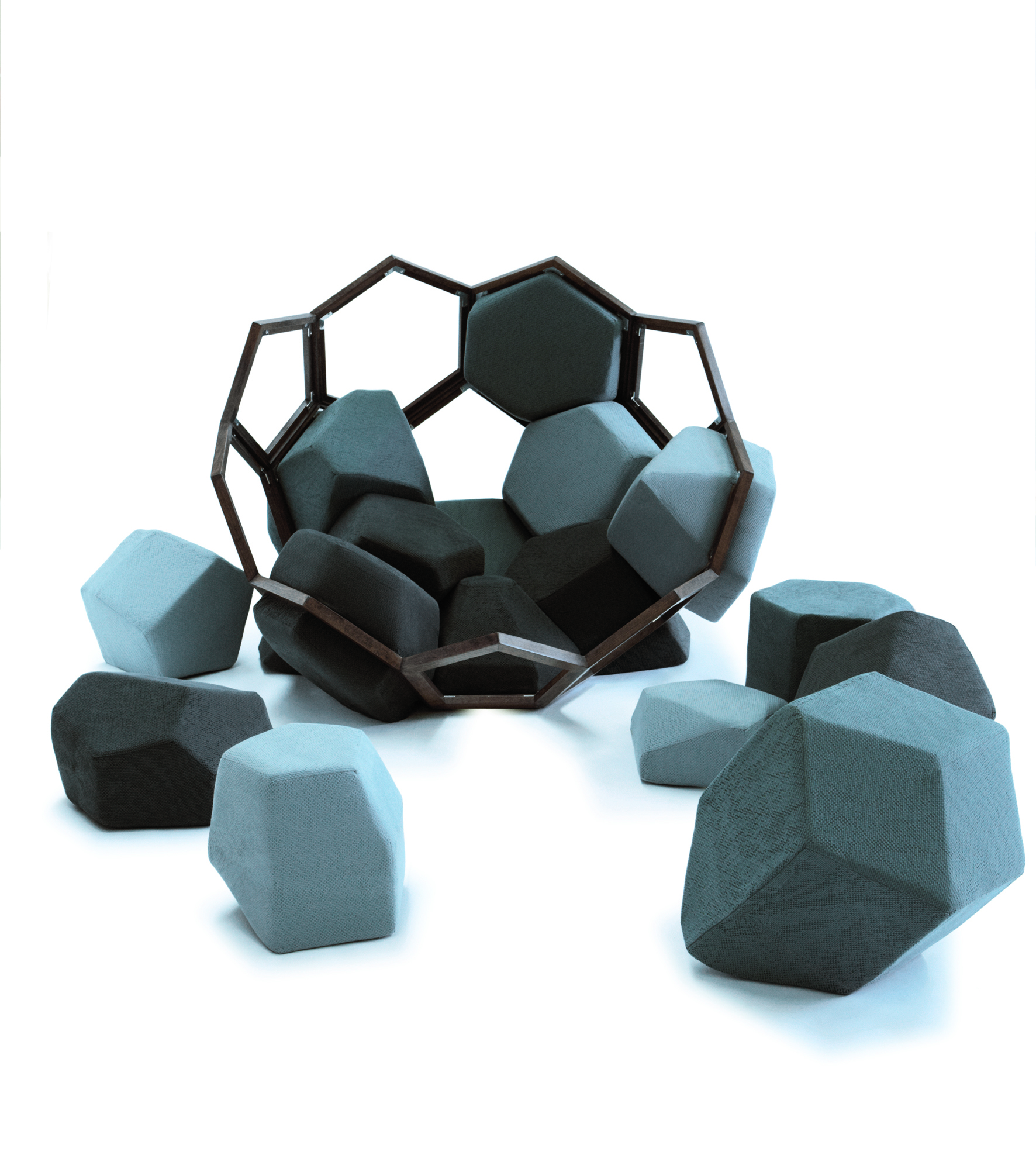
CTRLZAK for Biosofa: Quartz Armchair

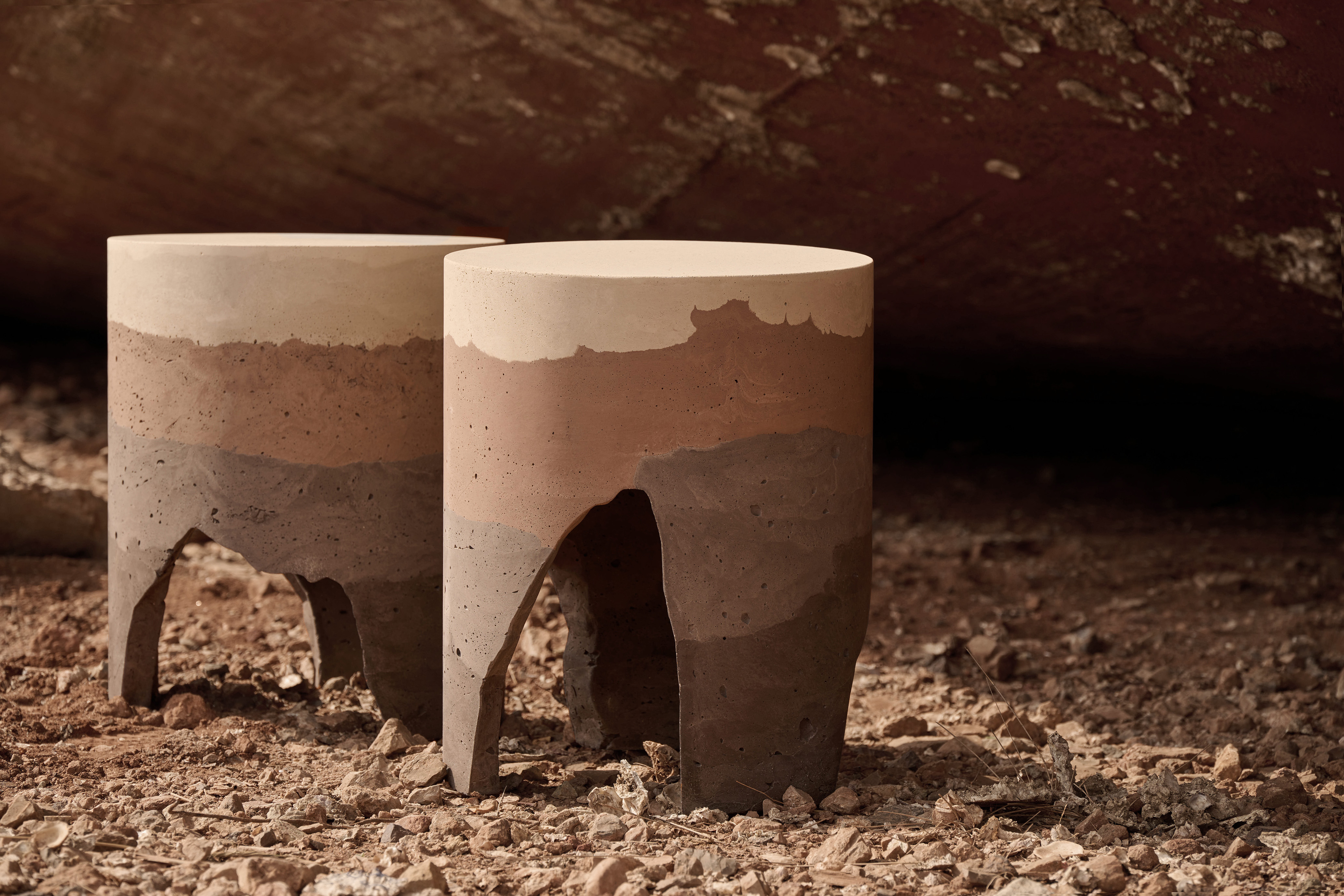
CTRLZAK for Urbi et Orbi: Strata Stool

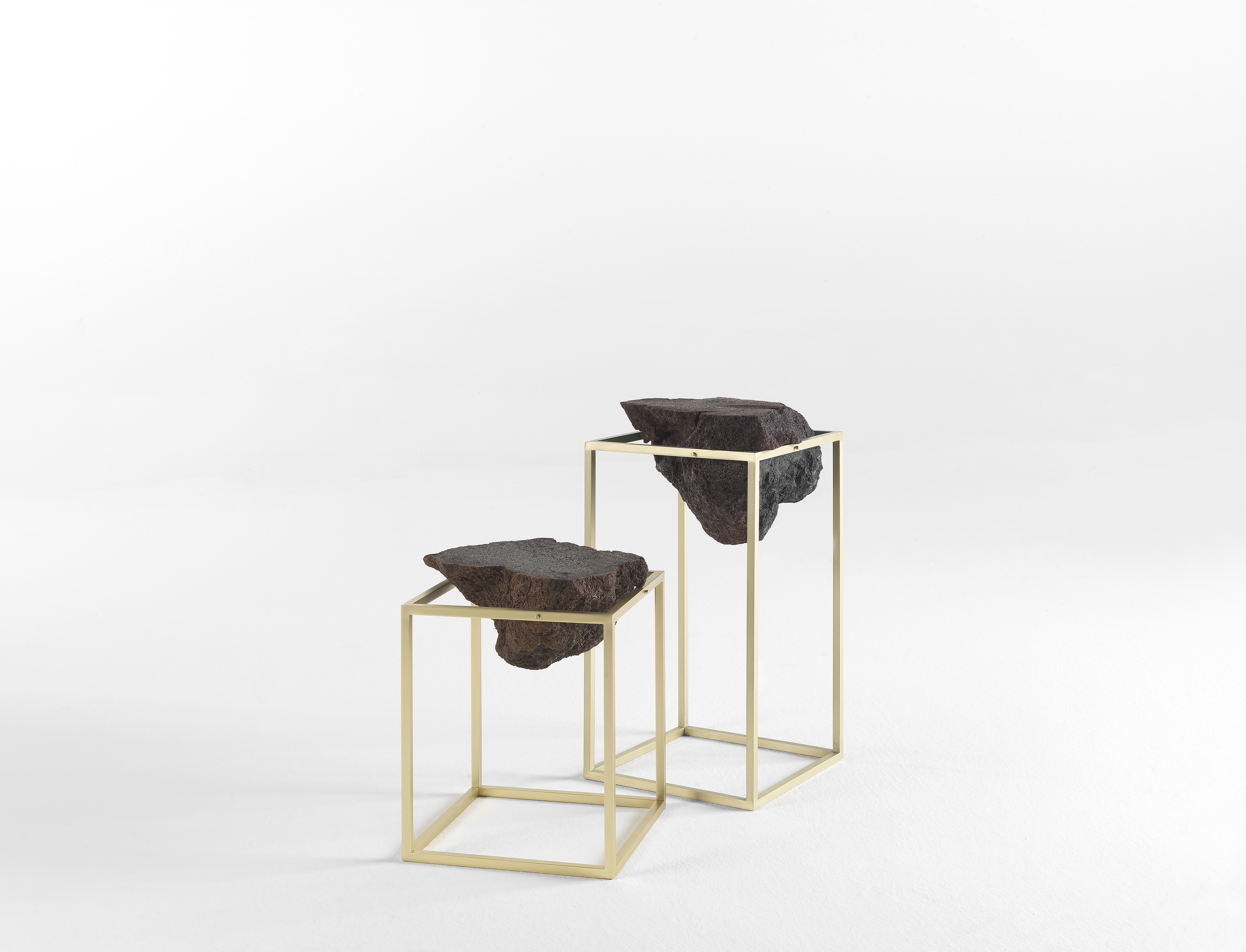
CTRLZAK for JCP Universe: Antivol side tables

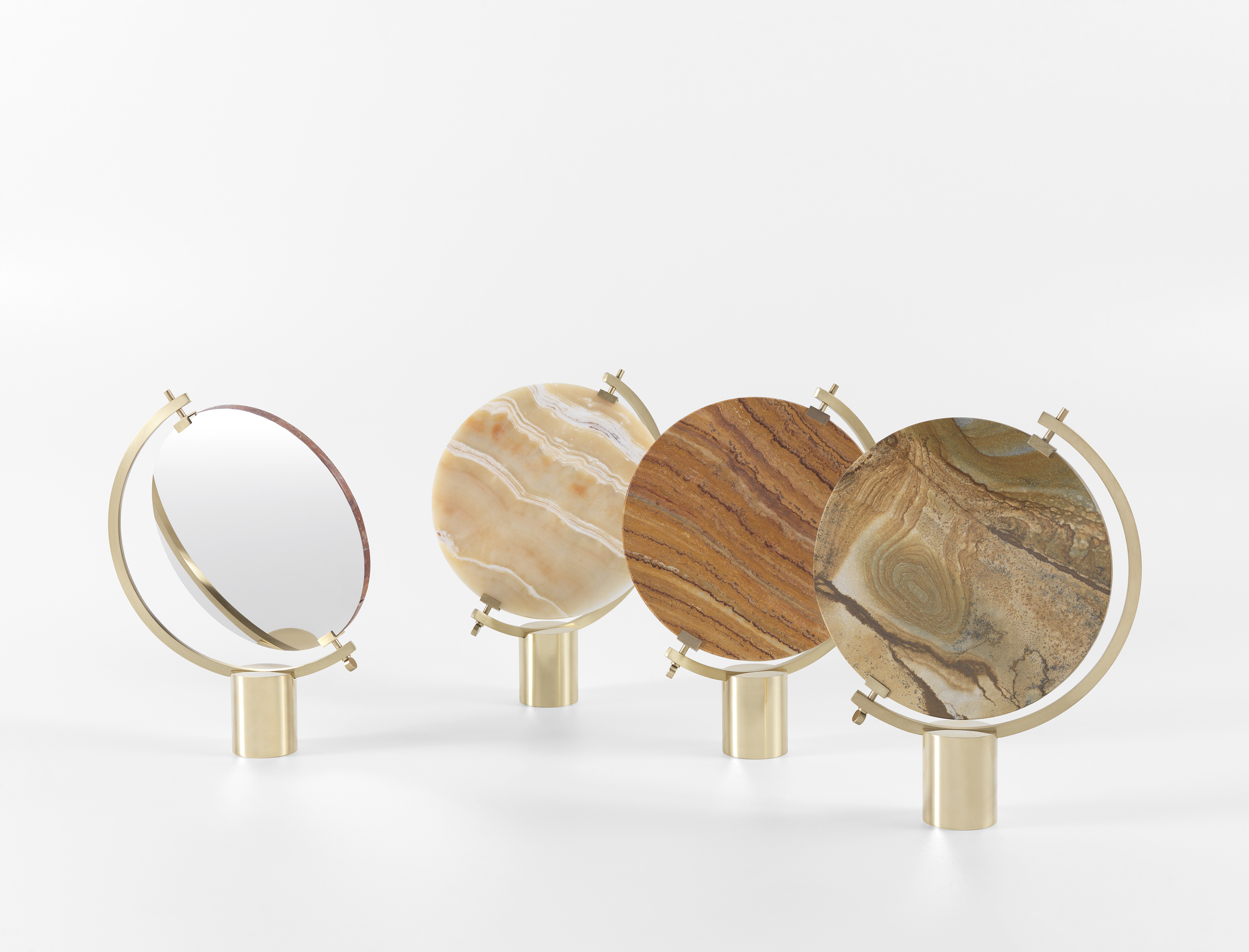
CTRLZAK for JCP Universe: Naia table mirror

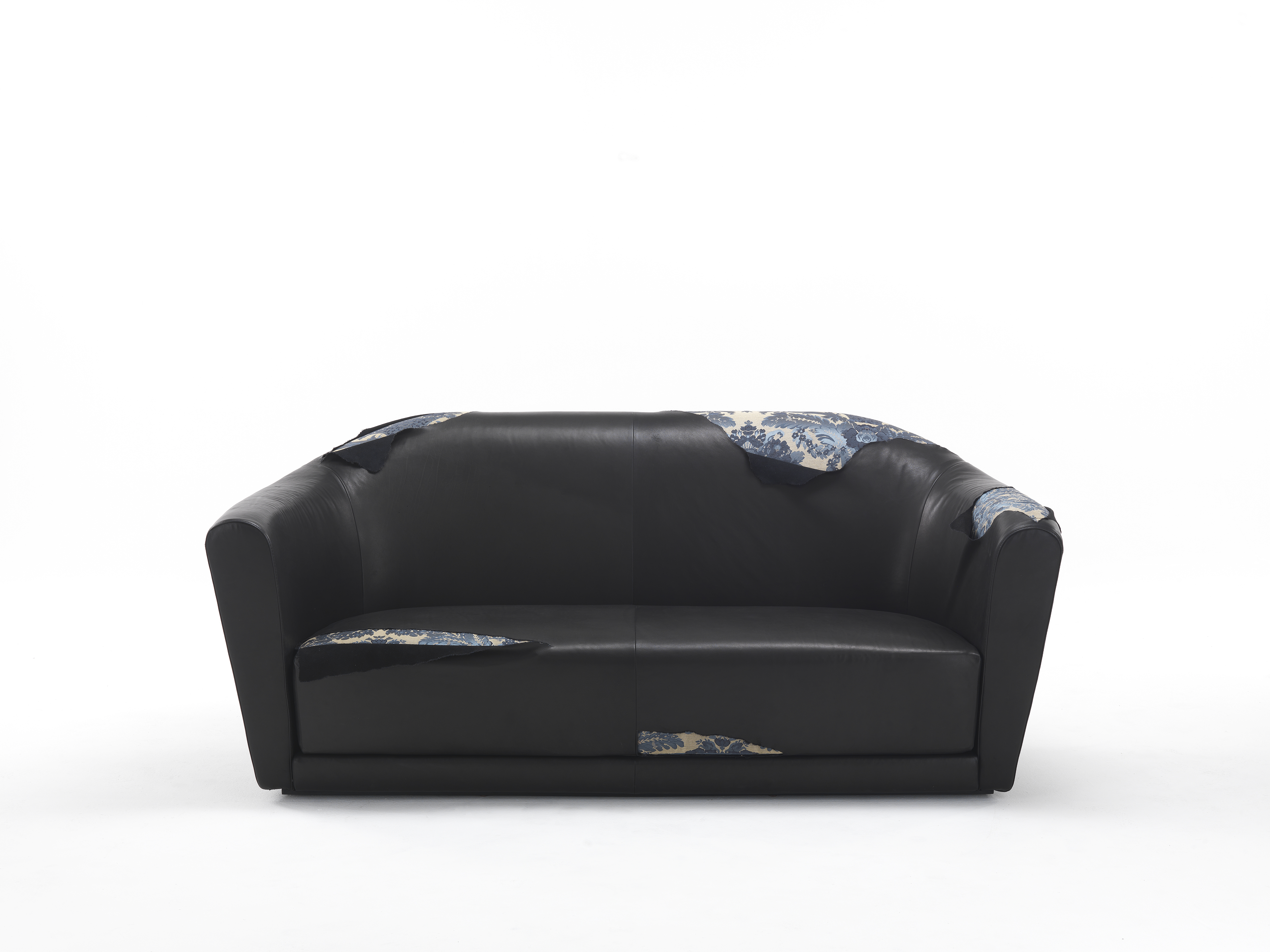
CTRLZAK for JCP Universe: Fylgrade sofa

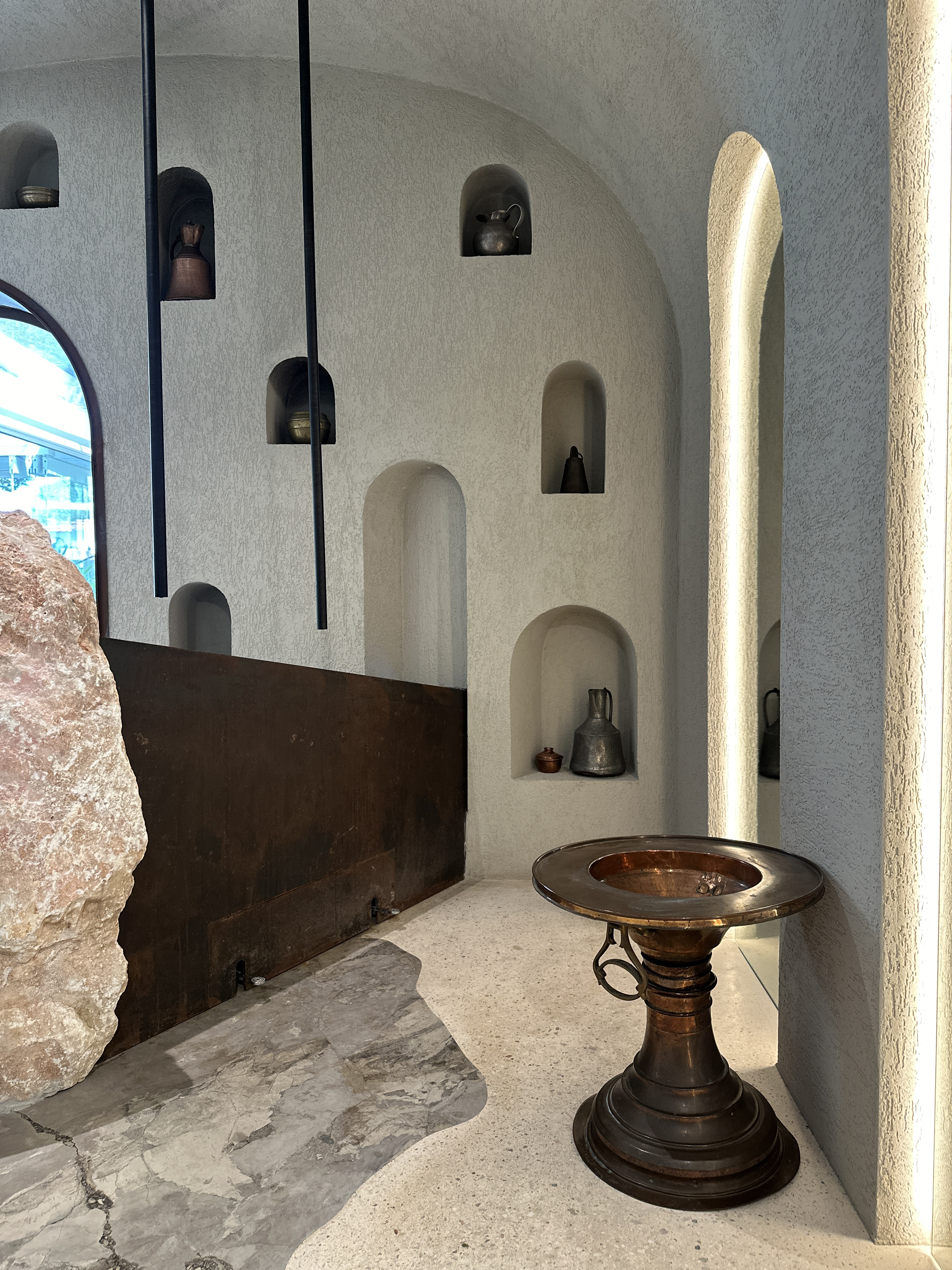
CTRLZAK for Ekies Resort: Bathroom

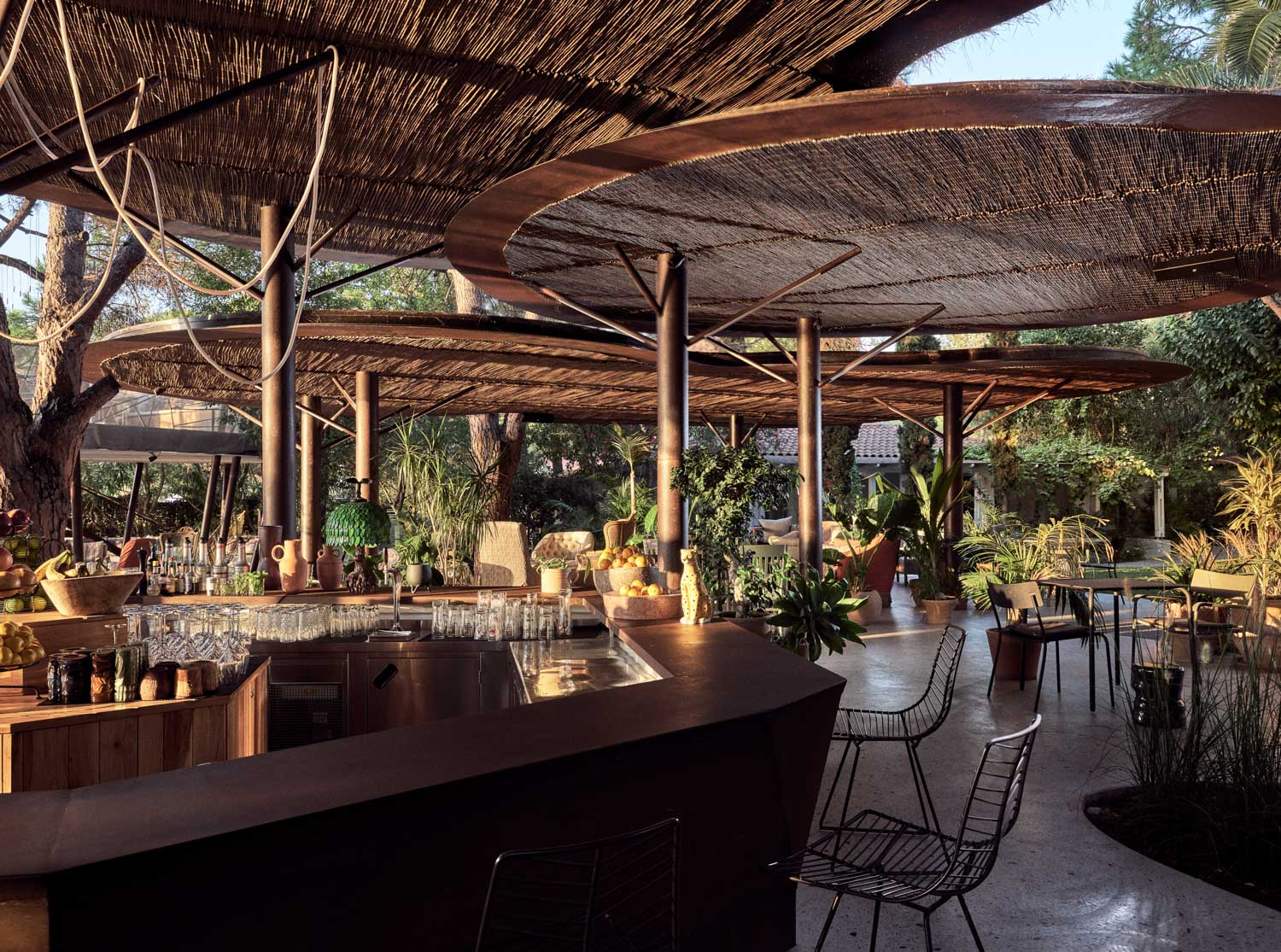
CTRLZAK for Ekies Resort: Outdoor Bar

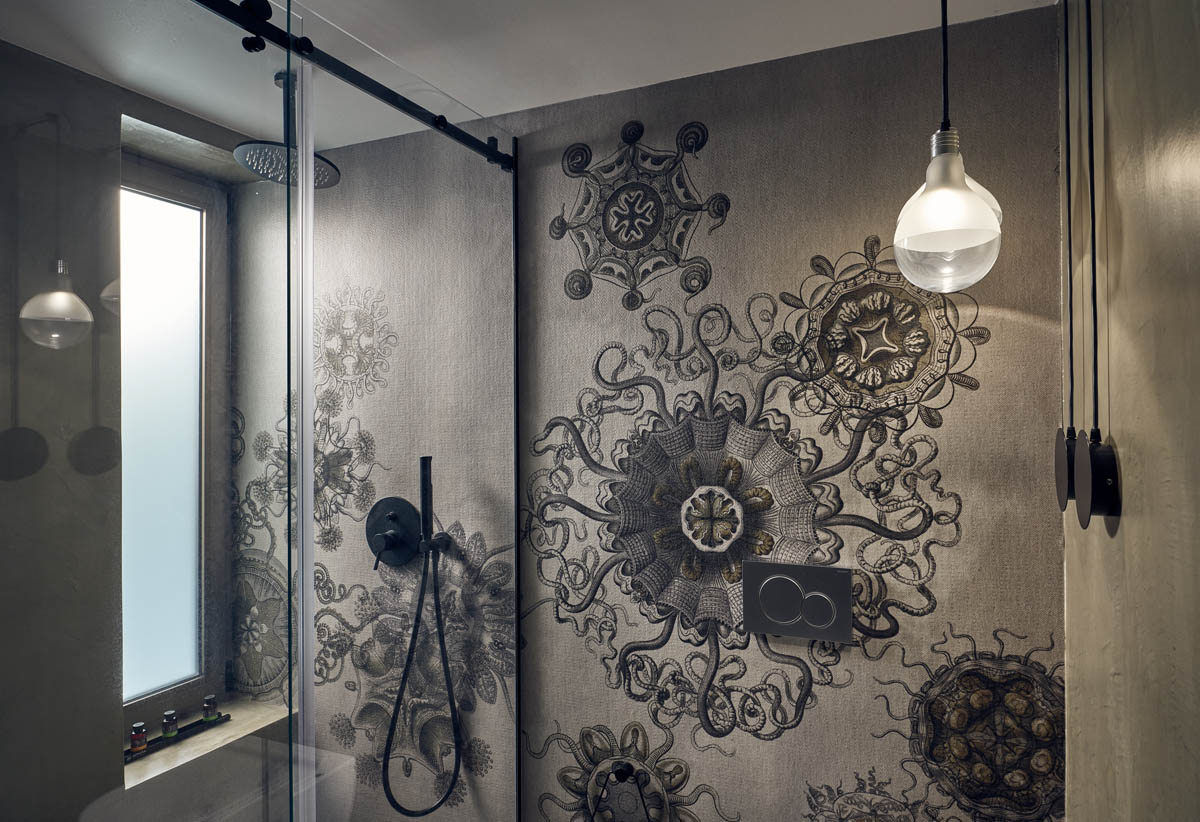
CTRLZAK for Wall & Deco: Medusae

== Recognition ==
CTRLZAK's creations have been extensively exhibited in art galleries and design fairs around the world and their work has been selected by museums and institutions like MOMA, the Louvre Museum and the Venice Art Biennale, among others.

== Selected bibliography ==
- Italian Textile Design, Marsilio Editori, 2023, pp.157, 203. ISBN 9791254630891
- Form Follows Meaning - Paradigms from CTRLZAK Studio, CTRLZAK Books, 2018.ISBN 9791220094870
- Salone Sattelite 20 Anni di Nuova Creatività, Corraini Edizioni, 2017, pp.109. ISBN 9788875706425
- The Design-City: Milan: Extraordinary Lab. Forma Edizioni, 2018, pp. 396–399. ISBN 9788899534660
- Ceci n’est pas une copie. Lannοο Publishers, 2016, pp. 205–207. ISBN 9789401440486
- La casa morbida. Corraini Edizioni, 2014, pp. 69. ISBN 9788875704438
- The New Italian Design, Triennale Design Museum, 2013, pp. 45. ISBN 9788889861059
- Modern Living Accessories 100 Years of Design. H.F.Ullmann Publishing, 2011, pp. 12–13. ISBN 9783848000418
- Leuchten/ Lighting. Edel Germany, 2009, pp. 38. ISBN 9783941378216
- Möbel/ Furniture. Edel Germany, 2009, pp. 207–208. ISBN 9783941378209
